The 2015 season was Doncaster Rovers Belles' fifth season in the FA WSL, and their second season in the second tier of English women's football.

After the Belles narrowly missed out on promotion in the previous season, Gordon Staniforth resigned on 30 October 2014. Former Lincoln Ladies manager Glen Harris was appointed on December 8, 2014, beating competition from all over Europe; including Belgium, Croatia, Italy and the UK.

This season also saw the introduction of a new club crest, combining the old-style Doncaster Belles badge, with the more recently used Doncaster Rovers badge.

Squad

Transfers

In

Out

Statistics

     

|-
|colspan="14"|Players who left the club during the season:
|}

Goals record

Matches

Pre-Season Friendlies
On 15 January 2015 Arsenal Ladies announced that they would play a friendly against the Belles, in a clash of two former heavyweights. On 28 January, Liverpool Ladies became the second club to announce a friendly against Doncaster.

FA Cup
On 12 January 2015 the draw for the Third Round Proper of the FA Women's Cup was made. The Belles were drawn at home to London Bees, with the match to be played on 1 February 2015. This fixture was then rearranged to be played a day earlier on 31 January. In the Fourth Round, Doncaster were drawn away to either Bradford City Women or FC Reedswood, depending on who won the postponed tie. The postponed match was won by Bradford, with the Fourth Round tie to be played on 8 March.

FA WSL Cup
Rovers were drawn in Group 2. They play 5 matches in the group.

FA WSL 2
On 26 January 2015, the fixtures for the coming season's WSL were released, with the Belles starting their fixtures at home to Durham Women.

References

Don
Don
Doncaster Rovers Belles L.F.C. seasons